The Audi RS Q e-tron is an off-road competition car, built by Audi under the e-tron battery electric sub-brand. It was specially designed to take part in the rally raids.

Development
It was mentioned as an unnamed prototype during the 2020-12-11 announcement of Q Motorsport becoming Audi factory team.

Specifications
The Dakar 2022 RS Q e-tron includes:
Two electric motors from Audi's Formula E program, one on each axle, for a combined power of under .

Competition history
On 30 November 2020, Audi announced their intent to compete in the Dakar Rally, and during the announcement on 11 December, in which Q Motorsport became Audi's factory team. Three crews of Carlos Sainz and Lucas Cruz, Stéphane Peterhansel and Edouard Boulanger and Mattias Ekström and Emil Bergkvist would drive the car.

On 23 July 2021, Audi unveiled the RS Q e-tron, an offroad racer intended to compete in the 2022 Dakar Rally. The car was quick but navigation errors from all 3 crews meant they lost hours of time on the first day. They even had many mechanical issues. Still all 3 drivers won a stage, with Sainz winning SS11 as well making it 4 stage wins on debut.

At the 2022 Abu Dhabi Desert Challenge, Peterhansel and Boulanger made history by winning the event and giving the RS Q e-tron its first win, and the first win for an electric vehicle in a rally raid.

References

External links
Press kit: RS Q e-tron (*This vehicle shown here is the Rally Dakar vehicle that is not available as a production model.)

Rally cars
Rally raid cars
RS Q e-tron
Hybrid electric cars
Electric cars
Cars introduced in 2021